The Wood–Morris–Bonfils house is a French Mediterranean Revival style house in the Capitol Hill neighborhood of Denver, Colorado.

It was built in 1909 or 1911. In 1974 it was listed on the National Register of Historic Places.

The house was the home of Guilford S. Wood, and later Andrew S. Hughes, and Helen Bonfils.  In the early 1980s it housed the Mexican Consulate, and after 1985 was divided into condominiums.

The house was documented by the Historic American Buildings Survey in 1967.

See also
 National Register of Historic Places listings in Downtown Denver

References

External links
 Info and photo at Denver Public Library
 More info at businessden.com

Houses on the National Register of Historic Places in Colorado
Houses completed in 1909
Houses in Denver